Martin Reid (5 November 1907 – 6 April 1970) was a Guyanese cricketer. He played in two first-class matches for British Guiana in 1925/26 and 1926/27.

See also
 List of Guyanese representative cricketers

References

External links
 

1907 births
1970 deaths
Guyanese cricketers
Guyana cricketers
Sportspeople from Georgetown, Guyana